The Waitati River is a river in New Zealand, flowing into the Pacific Ocean at Blueskin Bay, north of Dunedin. The Dunedin Northern Motorway follows the valley of the Waitati between the Leith Saddle and Waitati.

See also
List of rivers of New Zealand

References

Rivers of Otago
Rivers of New Zealand